Frank Buckley may refer to:

 Frank Buckley (athlete), British Olympic athlete
 Francis Buckley, known as Frank, Canadian businessman
 Frank Buckley (footballer), English football player and manager
 F.H. Buckley (born 1948), Canadian-American professor of law and speechwriter